The following lists events that happened during 1996 in New Zealand.

Population
 Estimated population as of 31 December: 3,762,300
 Increase since 31 December 1995: 55,600 (1.50%)
 Males per 100 Females: 97.3

Incumbents

Regal and viceregal
Head of State - Elizabeth II
Governor-General - The Rt Hon. Sir Michael Hardie Boys GNZM, GCMG, QSO

Government
The 44th New Zealand Parliament continued. Government was The National Party, led by Jim Bolger. In the 1996 New Zealand general election National was returned to power, but had to form a coalition with the New Zealand First.

Speaker of the House - Peter Tapsell then Doug Kidd
Prime Minister - Jim Bolger
Deputy Prime Minister - Don McKinnon then Winston Peters
Minister of Finance - Bill Birch
Minister of Foreign Affairs - Don McKinnon
Chief Justice — Sir Thomas Eichelbaum

Opposition leaders

See: :Category:Parliament of New Zealand, :New Zealand elections

Act - Roger Douglas then Richard Prebble
New Zealand First - Winston Peters 
United Future - Peter Dunne
Labour -  Helen Clark (Leader of the Opposition)
Alliance - Jim Anderton

Main centre leaders
Mayor of Auckland - Les Mills
Mayor of Hamilton - Margaret Evans
Mayor of Wellington - Mark Blumsky
Mayor of Christchurch - Vicki Buck
Mayor of Dunedin - Sukhi Turner

Events 
 April: The New Zealand Tablet winds up. The weekly Catholic newspaper started publication in 1873.
 1 November: Cartoon Network debuts on New Zealand television.
 November: Michael Jackson, the king of pop, performed in Auckland both nights (November 9 and November 11), as a part of his world tour, HIStory World Tour.
 Leaded petrol is phased out.

Arts and literature
Bernadette Hall wins the Robert Burns Fellowship.
Montana New Zealand Book Awards:
Book of the Year/Cultural Heritage: Judith Binney, Redemption Songs - A Life of Te Kooti Arikirangi Te Turuki
First Book Awards
Fiction: Emily Perkins, Not Her Real Name
Poetry: James Brown, Go Round Power Please
Non-Fiction: Alex Frame, Salmond: Southern Jurist
f*INK, Dunedin's weekly entertainment magazine is founded

See 1996 in art, 1996 in literature, :Category:1996 books

Music

New Zealand Music Awards
Winners are shown first with nominees underneath.

Album of the Year: Shihad - Killjoy
Finn Brothers - Finn
Howard Morrison - Songs of New Zealand
Max Lines - Beautiful Panflute I
Starlight String Quartet - Romantic Strings
Suzanne Prentice - 25th Anniversary
Single of the Year: OMC – How Bizarre
D-Faction - Down in the Boondocks
Herbs - French Letter '95
Jan Hellriegel - Manic
The Exponents - La La Lulu
Strawpeople - Sweet Disorder
Best Male Vocalist: Jon Toogood – Shihad
Greg Johnson
Dave Dobbyn
Best Female Vocalist: Teremoana Rapley
Sulata
Jan Hellriegel
Best Group: Shihad 
The Exponents
The Mutton Birds
Finn Brothers
Rising Star Award: Kylie Harris
Bic Runga
Glen Moffat
Most Promising Male Vocalist: Paul Fuemana (OMC)
Jeremy Eade (Garageland)
Otis Frizzell (Joint Force)
Most Promising Female Vocalist: Bic Runga
Celia Mancini (King Loser)
Jordan Reyne
Most Promising Group: OMC
Garageland
Joint Force
International Achievement: Shihad
Finn Brothers
Dave Dobbyn
Supergroove
Best Video: Sigi Spath / Jo Fisher – You Gotta Know (Supergroove)
Greg Page - Honeyblonde (Throw)
M Noonan and J Frizzell - Static PTI (Joint Force)
Best Producer: Eddie Rayner - World Stand Still
Alan Jansson, Nathan Haines and James Pinker - Shift Left (Nathan Haines)
Malcolm Welsford - La La Lulu (The Exponents)
Best Engineer: Alan Jansson – How Bizarre (Omc)
Chris Sinclair - Black Sand Shore (Grace)
Malcolm Welsford - La La Lulu (The Exponents)
Best Jazz Album: Nathan Haines – Shift Left
Hattie St John - Flying High at Iguacu
Christchurch Polytechnic Sextet - Collaboration
Best Classical Album: Michael Houston - Beethoven Piano Sonatas from the Middle Period
Alexander Ivashkin and Tamas Vesmas - Alfred Schnittke
L Subramaniam - Pacific Rendezvous
Best Country Album: Kylie Harris – Let It Be Love
Glen Moffat - Somewhere in New Zealand Tonight
Kevin Greaves - Over the Storm
Best Folk Album: Rua – Harbour Lights
Chris Thompson - Song for Laura
Peter Skandera and Dave Maybee - Acoustic Spirit
Best Gospel Album: Brent Chambers – Living Sacrifices
Alastair Brown - Narrow
Paul Stephens - Apocalypse
Best Mana Maori Album: Southside of Bombay with Mina Ripia – Kia Mau
Maree Sheehan - Past to Present
Moana and The Moahunters - Give it Up Now
Ruia - Ka Tangi te Tiitii Ka Tangi to Kaakaa
Best Mana Reo Album: Southside of Bombay with Mina Ripia – Kia Mau
Ruia - Ka Tangi te Tiitii Ka Tangi te Kaakaa
Moana and the Moa Hunters - Akona Te Reo '95
Best Children's Album: Nga Pihi - 1 & 2
Radha and the Kiwis - Sing the World Around
Kids TV - You and Me Songbook (Suzy Cato)
Best Polynesian Album: Southside of Bombay - Umbadada
D-Faction - Down in the Boondocks
John Akaata - Ura Mai Koe
Purest Form - If I Fell/U Can Do It
Best Songwriter: Mark Tierney / Paul Casserly / Anthony Ioasa - Sweet Disorder (Strawpeople)
Glen Moffat - Somewhere in New Zealand Tonight
Greg Johnson - Don't Wait Another Day
Best Cover: Alec Bathgate – Abbasalutely
Chris Knox - Songs of You and Me
Neil Finn and Wayne Conway - Finn

See: 1996 in music

Performing arts

 Benny Award presented by the Variety Artists Club of New Zealand to Keith Leggett.

Radio and television

See: 1996 in New Zealand television, 1996 in television, List of TVNZ television programming, TV3 (New Zealand), Public broadcasting in New Zealand

 The New Zealand Government sells the Radio New Zealand commercial arm to Clear Channel creating The Radio Network

Film
Broken English
Chicken
Jack Brown Genius
Flight of the Albatross
Someone Else's Country
The Frighteners
The Whole of the Moon

See: :Category:1996 film awards, 1996 in film, List of New Zealand feature films, Cinema of New Zealand, :Category:1996 films

Internet

See: NZ Internet History

Sport

Athletics
Phil Costley wins his first national title in the men's marathon, clocking 2:20:32 on 27 October in Auckland, while Tracey Clissold claims her first in the women's championship (2:39:03).

Basketball
 The NBL was won by Auckland.

Cricket
Various Tours, New Zealand cricket team, Chappell–Hadlee Trophy, Cricket World Cup

Golf
 New Zealand Open
 Check :Category:New Zealand golfers in overseas tournaments.

Horse racing

Harness racing
 New Zealand Trotting Cup: Il Vicolo - 2nd win
 Auckland Trotting Cup: Sharp And Telford

Thoroughbred racing

Netball
 Silver Ferns
 National Bank Cup

Olympic Games

 New Zealand sends a team of 97 competitors.

Paralympics

 New Zealand sends a team of 30 competitors across seven sports.

Rugby league

 The Lion Red Cup was won by the Counties Manukau Heroes who beat the Waitakere City Raiders 34–22 in the grand final. Waitakere were the minor premiers.
 In their second season the Auckland Warriors placed 11th of 20 teams in the Australian National Rugby League competition. They had been in finals contention until losing their last six games.
5 October, New Zealand defeated Papua New Guinea 62-8
11 October, New Zealand defeated Papua New Guinea 64-0

The 1996 Great Britain Lions tour saw the three Tet matches played in New Zealand:
18 October, New Zealand defeated Great Britain 17-12
25 October, New Zealand defeated Great Britain 18-15
1 November, New Zealand defeated Great Britain 32-12

Rugby union
:Category:Rugby union in New Zealand, Super 14, Rugby Union World Cup, National Provincial Championship, :Category:All Blacks, Bledisloe Cup, Tri Nations Series, Ranfurly Shield

Shooting
Ballinger Belt – Graeme Ballinger (Levin)

Soccer
 The National Summer Soccer League was inaugurated to replace the New Zealand National Soccer League, so there was no 1996 league champion.
 The New Zealand national soccer team placed third in the OFC Nations Cup, which this year was played as a league rather than a tournament.
 The Chatham Cup is won by Waitakere City F.C. who beat Mt Wellington 3–1 in the final.

Births

January
 1 January – Benjamin Lister, cricketer
 5 January – James Fisher-Harris, rugby league player
 10 January – Jamie-Lee Price, netballer
 13 January
 Mitch Jacobson, rugby union player
 Oliver Sail, association footballer
 28 January – Gabby Westbrook-Patrick, model
 31 January – Jordan Trainor, rugby union player

February
 6 February – Rhett Purcell, tennis player
 7 February – Piera Hudson, alpine skier
 10 February – Nicole van der Kaay, triathlete
 11 February – Jack Salt, basketball player
 14 February – Poasa Faamausili, rugby league player
 19 February – Amy Robinson, field hockey player
 28 February – Rosa Flanagan, athlete
 29 February
 Nelson Asofa-Solomona, rugby league player
 Tarryn Davey, field hockey player
 Claudia Williams, tennis player

March
 8 March – Leni Apisai, rugby league player
 11 March – Matthew Ridenton, association footballer
 14 March – Andrew Blake, association footballer
 16 March – Tyrel Lomax, rugby union player
 20 March – Deklan Wynne, association footballer
 22 March – Tamupiwa Dimairo, association footballer
 24 March – Jack Boyle, cricketer
 26 March – Zane Musgrove, rugby league player

April
 3 April – Cory Brown, association footballer
 14 April – Jessee Wyatt, athlete
 15 April – Nathaniel Roache, rugby league player
 20 April – Caleb Makene, rugby union player
 23 April – Ollie Jones, cyclist
 29 April – Nicholas Kergozou, cyclist

May
 9 May – Jonah Lowe, rugby union player
 10 May
 Henry Shipley, cricketer
 Taniela Tupou, rugby league player
 12 May – Hugh Renton, rugby union player
 23 May – Maddison Keeney, diver
 27 May – Sio Tomkinson, rugby union player
 29 May – Holly Rose Emery, model
 31 May – Brandon Smith, rugby league player

June
 1 June – Adam Mitchell, association footballer
 4 June – Meikayla Moore, association footballer
 5 June
 Gayle Broughton, rugby union player
 Jamayne Isaako, rugby league player
 6 June – Ofahiki Ogden, rugby league player
 7 June – Jackie Gowler, rower
 10 June – TJ Va'a, rugby union player
 12 June
 Luke Mudgway, cyclist
 Alex Rufer, association footballer
 18 June – Sam Nock, rugby union player
 29 June
 Joseph Manu, rugby league player
 Mikayla Pirini, basketball player
 30 June – Louisa Tuilotolava, field hockey player

July
 1 July – Lauchie Johns, cricketer
 3 July – Aidan Sarikaya, field hockey player
 5 July – Alex Ridley, cricketer
 11 July – David Liti, weightlifter
 16 July – Josh Iosefa-Scott, rugby union player
 20 July – Jasmine Pereira, association footballer
 26 July – Jamie Curry, vlogger, comedian
 27 July – Luther Hirini, rugby union player
 29 July – Marata Niukore, rugby league player

August
 16 August – Sefo Kautai, rugby union player
 17 August
 Hamish Kerr, high jumper
 Esan Marsters, rugby league player
 20 August – Bunty Afoa, rugby league player
 21 August – Quinten Strange, rugby union player

September
 5 September – Isaac Salmon, rugby union player
 6 September – Nicholas Reddish, cyclist
 12 September
 Aaron Booth, decathlete
 Ryan Christensen, cyclist
 Pari Pari Parkinson, rugby union player
 13 September – Botille Vette-Welsh, rugby league player
 19 September – Lukhan Salakaia-Loto, rugby union player
 25 September – Salesi Rayasi, rugby union player
 29 September – Jahrome Brown, rugby union player

October
 2 October
 Tayler Reid, triathlete
 Michaela Sokolich-Beatson, netball player
 3 October – Hannah Rowe, cricketer
 4 October – Brett Cameron, rugby union player
 5 October
 Lisati Milo-Harris, rugby union player
 Jayden Nikorima, rugby league player
 6 October
 Regan Gough, cyclist
 Elizabeth Ross, rower
 9 October – Eliza Grigg, alpine skier
 18 October – Frances Davies, field hockey player
 22 October – Kelly Jury, netball player
 24 October – Ayden Johnstone, rugby union player
 25 October – Alex Nankivell, rugby union player

November
 2 November – Andre de Jong, association footballer
 4 November – Jana Radosavljević, association footballer
 7 November
 Hades, Thoroughbred racehorse
 Ella Yelich-O'Connor (aka Lorde), singer-songwriter
 10 November – Emma Rolston, association footballer
 14 November – Shaun Stevenson, rugby union player
 15 November – Georgia Marris, swimmer

December
 5 December – Holly Edmondston, cyclist
 6 December
 Glenn Phillips, cricketer
 Mark Telea, rugby union player
 8 December – Josh Finnie, cricketer
 9 December – Monty Patterson, association footballer
 11 December – Eliza McCartney, pole vaulter
 23 December – Nik Tzanev, association footballer
 24 December – Richard Kam, ice dancer
 28 December – Fin Hoeata, rugby union player
 30 December – Brad Abbey, rugby league player

Deaths

January–March
 4 January – Jim Robertson, historian (born 1896)
 6 January – Beeban McKnight, entertainer, cinema operator, community leader (born 1897)
 9 January – Herbert Money, evangelical missionary (born 1899)
 17 January – Arnold Anderson, athlete (born 1912)
 30 January – Guy Doleman, actor (born 1923)
 31 January – Sir Peter Tait, politician (born 1915)
 24 February – Graeme Moran, rower (born 1938)
 26 February – Don Oliver, weightlifter, fitness entrepreneur (born 1937)
 4 March − John Spencer, yacht designer (born 1931)
 9 March – Harold Baigent, actor (born 1916)

April–June
 16 April – Archie Dunningham, librarian (born 1907)
 17 April – Robbie Robson, lawn bowls player (born 1918)
 21 April – Paraone Reweti, politician (born 1916)
 26 April – Terence Vaughan, musician, performing arts administrator (born 1915)
 1 May – Bruce McLeod, rugby union player (born 1940)
 10 May – Ronald Bush, rugby union player and coach, cricketer (born 1909)
 11 May – Rob Hall, mountaineer (born 1961)
 16 May – Robert Hurst, nuclear scientist (born 1915)
 22 May – John George, politician (born 1901)
 26 May – Vince Bevan, rugby union player (born 1921)
 30 May – Balmerino, thoroughbred racehorse (foaled 1972)
 31 May – Robert Holden, motorcycle racer (born 1958)
 1 June – Jack Hemi, rugby union and rugby league player (born 1914)
 2 June – Freda Bream, writer (born 1918)
 3 June – Ben Couch, rugby union player, politician (born 1925)
 5 June – Ian Grey, historian (born 1918)
 7 June – Tom Puna, cricketer (born 1929)
 9 June – Leo Schultz, politician (born 1914)
 16 June – Richard Sylvan, philosopher (born 1935)
 17 June – Doug Harris, athlete (born 1919)
 18 June – Florence Andrews, fencer (born 1912)
 19 June – Eric Fisher, cricketer (born 1924)
 20 June – Colin Gillies, rugby union player (born 1912)

July–September
 3 July – Barry Crump, author (born 1935)
 11 July – Bob Whaitiri, community leader (born 1916)
 17 July – Nell Rose, nurse (born 1996)
 25 July – Andy Keyworth, master mariner (born 1923)
 10 August – Les George, rugby union player and administrator (born 1908)
 16 August – Lena Manuel, community leader (born 1915)
 27 August – Josie Yelas, netball player (born 1924)
 10 September – Patrick Rhind, rugby union player (born 1915)
 13 September – Dot Simons, sports journalist and writer (born 1912)
 23 September – Sir Jack Newman, cricketer, businessman (born 1902)
 26 September – Athol Rafter, nuclear chemist (born 1913)

October–December
 1 October
 James Beal, boxer (born 1929)
 Patrick Jameson, World War II flying ace (born 1912)
 10 October – Harold Cleghorn, weightlifter (born 1912)
 12 October – Fred Miller, journalist, historian (born 1904)
 22 October – Noel Hilliard, author and novelist (born 1929)
 24 October – Robert Anderson, politician (born 1936)
 27 October – Piet van Asch, aviator, aerial photographer and surveyor (born 1911)
 28 October – Jimmy Haig, rugby union and rugby league player (born 1924)
 5 November – Hugh Sew Hoy, businessman, community leader (born 1901)
 15 November – Les Watt, cricketer (born 1924)
 23 November – Eve Rimmer, athlete (born 1937)
 26 November 
 Dame Joan Hammond, opera singer (born 1912)
 Te Waari Whaitiri, master mariner, community leader (born 1912)
 12 December – Elaine Gurr, doctor and medical administrator (born 1896)
 17 December
 Lawrie Miller, cricketer (born 1923)
 Violet Walrond, swimmer (born 1905)
 22 December – William Lunn, rugby union player (born 1926)
 25 December – Harry Watson, cyclist (born 1904)

References

See also
List of years in New Zealand
Timeline of New Zealand history
History of New Zealand
Military history of New Zealand
Timeline of the New Zealand environment
Timeline of New Zealand's links with Antarctica

 
New Zealand
Years of the 20th century in New Zealand